Knowles (formerly, Dusy's Rock Pile) is an unincorporated community in Madera County, California.

A post office operated at Knowles from 1902 to 1955. The name honors F. E. Knowles, owner of a local granite quarry.

References

Unincorporated communities in California
Unincorporated communities in Madera County, California